Stamford Harbor Ledge Lighthouse is a lighthouse in Connecticut, United States, on Chatham Rock off of Stamford, Connecticut. It was added to the National Register of Historic Places in 1991.

The interior of the structure has seven levels.  The upper balcony boasts sweeping views of the Stamford and Manhattan skylines, as well as Long Island Sound and Stamford Harbor.  The lighthouse is accessed by a floating dock.

History

The Stamford Harbor Ledge lighthouse was built in 1882 and was a sparkplug lighthouse cast iron tower, manufactured in Boston. The light,  from shore, was sold to a private party in 1955.

Several lighthouse keepers and their families lived in the lighthouse at various times.

In 2008, the property was put up for sale, with an asking price of $1.75 million as of September 25, 2008. By June 2009, the asking price had fallen to $1.595 million, according to the real estate agent's website. According to an advertisement for the real estate offering, the property includes the lighthouse, Chatham Rock and, in words that were in quotes in the advertisement, "surrounding underwater land embraced within a circle, seven hundred fifty (750) feet in diameter, the center of which is Chatham Rock".

Head keepers

 Neil Martin (1882)
 Nahor Jones (1882 – 1886)
 Samuel C. Gardiner (1886)
 John Ryle (1886 – 1887)
 Samuel A. Keeney (1887 – 1903)
 Maurice Russell (1903 – 1904)
 Adolph Obman (1904 – 1907)
 John J. Cook (1907 – 1909)
 William Janse (1909)
 Adolph Obman (1909 – 1911)
 Robert R. Laurier (1911 – 1912)
 John H. Paul (1912)
 Joseph Meyer (at least 1913)
 Charles R. Riley (at least 1915 – at least 1916)
 Edward Grime (1917 – 1919)
 George Washington Denton, Jr. (1919)
 Edward Murphy (1919 – 1920)
 Edward Iten (at least 1921 – at least 1927)
 Edward M. Whitford (at least 1929)
 Robert M. Fitton (at least 1930)
 Raymond F. Bliven (1930 – 1931)
 Martin Luther Sowle (1938 – 1953)

See also

 List of lighthouses in Connecticut
 List of lighthouses in the United States
National Register of Historic Places listings in Stamford, Connecticut

References

Lighthouses completed in 1882
Lighthouses in Fairfield County, Connecticut
Buildings and structures in Stamford, Connecticut
Lighthouses on the National Register of Historic Places in Connecticut
National Register of Historic Places in Fairfield County, Connecticut